The 2015 Vaahteraliiga season was the 36th season of the highest level of American football in Finland. The regular season took place between June 11 and August 31, 2015. The Finnish champion was determined in the playoffs, and at the championship game Vaahteramalja XXXVI the Helsinki Roosters won fourth consecutive championship, this time against the Seinäjoki Crocodiles.

Standings

Playoffs

References

American football in Finland
Vaahteraliiga
Vaahteraliiga